Gregory of Khandzta (Georgian: გრიგოლ ხანძთელი, Grigol Khandzteli; 759 – 5 October 861) was a Georgian ecclesiastic figure and a founder and leader of numerous monastic communities in Tao-Klarjeti, a historical region in the Southwest of Georgia.

Born into an aristocratic family in Kartli, Gregory was raised at the court of the prince Nerse of Iberia, whose wife was Gregory's paternal aunt. He left his home when he was young and became a monk in the region  of Klarjeti (now located in north-eastern Turkey), the only region of Georgia free of Arab presence. After a short time in the monastery of Opiza (ოპიზა), he founded his own monastery at Khandzta (ხანძთა) which soon attracted an increasing number of brethren. He founded several other monasteries in Klarjeti, and subsequently he was elected as their archimandrite. The monasteries and their scriptoria functioned as centres of wisdom for centuries and played an important role in the development of a national Georgian culture.

At the same time, Ashot I Kuropalates, the presiding prince of Iberia, had chosen Artanuji in Klarjeti as his residence and stronghold in his effort to assert independence from other regional powers, such as the Abbasid Caliphate or the Byzantine Empire. Gregory played a prominent role to mobilize popular sentiment against Muslim presence in the Caucasus. His influence grew so strong that he was able to affect both the political and the private lives of the Georgian princes.

Saint Gregory of Khandzta died as a centenarian in 861, surrounded by followers and disciples. The Georgian Orthodox Church marks his memory on the day of his death, October 18. His life was compiled in the hagiographic work written by Giorgi Merchule in 951.

References

Saints of Georgia (country)
Centenarians from Georgia (country)
759 births
861 deaths
Christian monks from Georgia (country)
9th-century Christian saints
9th-century people from Georgia (country)
Men centenarians
Hymnwriters from Georgia (country)